The 1975–76 Houston Aeros season was the Aeros' fourth season of operation in the World Hockey Association (WHA). The Aeros again qualified first for the playoffs and made it to the Avco Cup Final but lost the championship to the Winnipeg Jets. This was the first season that the Aeros played in the Summit after three seasons at Sam Houston Coliseum.

Regular season
Gordie Howe scored 102 points, while his son Mark led the team with 39 goals.

Final standings

Game log

Playoffs
The Aeros defeated the San Diego Mariners in the quarter-final round 4–2. The Aeros next defeated the New England Whalers 4–3 in the semi-final round to advance to the Final. While the Aeros won the series, they had nothing left for the Final and the Winnipeg Jets defeated the Aeros 4–0 to win the Avco Cup.

Houston Aeros 4, San Diego Mariners 2 – Quarterfinals

Houston Aeros 4, New England Whalers 3 – Semifinals

Winnipeg Jets 4, Houston Aeros 0 – Avco Cup Finals

Player stats

Note: Pos = Position; GP = Games played; G = Goals; A = Assists; Pts = Points; +/- = plus/minus; PIM = Penalty minutes; PPG = Power-play goals; SHG = Short-handed goals; GWG = Game-winning goals
      MIN = Minutes played; W = Wins; L = Losses; T = Ties; GA = Goals-against; GAA = Goals-against average; SO = Shutouts;

Awards and records

Transactions

Draft picks
Houston's draft picks at the 1975 WHA Amateur Draft.

Farm teams

See also
1975–76 WHA season

References

External links

Houston
Houston
Houston Aeros seasons